NHL 08 is a video game released on September 11, 2007 in North America; the Xbox 360 version was supposed to be released on the same date as the Microsoft Windows, PlayStation 2 and PlayStation 3 versions, but was postponed for a day due to shipping issues. This was the first installment to be released on the PlayStation 3.

Gameplay
NHL 08 features a new and improved "Skill Stick System," which EA says will allow gamers to more easily control the puck. NHL 08 also includes "Goalie Mode," where users can control their team's goalie with a new third-person camera. Another new feature is the ability to create custom plays, where you can take part in creating custom plays in practice mode.

Gameplay modes
'Dynasty Mode' allows users to create a dream team and play through to the Stanley Cup, however, there is no fantasy draft on the current generation version of the game (Xbox 360, PlayStation 3), only on the PC and PlayStation 2 versions.

The game features the-then 29 teams of the American Hockey League (AHL). Players can develop talent through the AHL, and then call up their prospects to play in the NHL. Every AHL team is fully playable. Sweden's Elitserien and Finland's SM-liiga are also included on the Xbox 360 and PlayStation. However, the Deutsche Eishockey Liga (DEL) and Czech Extraliga are only to be found on the PC and PlayStation 2 versions.

Reception
The PlayStation 3 and Xbox 360 versions received "favorable" reviews, while the PlayStation 2 and PC versions received "mixed or average reviews", according to the review aggregation website Metacritic.

Games for Windows: The Official Magazine gave it a score of five out of ten. The game won GameSpot's "Best Sports Game of 2007" award.

Legacy 
NHL 08 was included in EA Sports 08 Collection in 2008 along with Madden NFL 08, Tiger Woods PGA Tour 08, FIFA 08 and NBA Live 08.

References

External links

2007 video games
EA Sports games
Electronic Arts games
HB Studios games
Multiplayer and single-player video games
NHL (video game series)
PlayStation 2 games
PlayStation 3 games
Video games developed in Canada
Video games set in 2007
Video games set in 2008
Video games set in Canada
Video games set in the United States
Windows games
Xbox 360 games